Goostrey is a civil parish in Cheshire East, England. It contains 19 buildings that are recorded in the National Heritage List for England as designated listed buildings.  Of these, one is listed at Grade I, the highest grade, three are listed at Grade II*, the middle grade, and the others are at Grade II.  Apart from the village of Goostrey, the parish is mainly rural.  It contains the Jodrell Bank Observatory, with its Grade I listed Lovell Telescope and its control building.  In the village, the listed buildings include the church and associated structures, the former schoolmaster's house, and a row of cottages.  Outside the village they include country houses, farmhouses, and farm buildings, some of which date back to the 16th century and are timber-framed.

Key

Buildings

See also

Listed buildings in Allostock
Listed buildings in Cranage
Listed buildings in Lower Withington
Listed buildings in Peover Superior
Listed buildings in Twemlow

References
Citations

Sources

 

 

Listed buildings in the Borough of Cheshire East
Lists of listed buildings in Cheshire